Mary Ellen Bute (November 21, 1906 – October 17, 1983) was a pioneer American film animator, producer, and director. She was one of the first female experimental filmmakers, and was the creator of some of the first electronically generated film images. Her specialty was visual music; while working in New York City between 1934 and 1958, Bute made fourteen short abstract musical films. Many of these were seen in regular movie theaters, such as Radio City Music Hall, usually preceding a prestigious film. Several of her abstract films were part of her Seeing Sound series.

Biography
A native of Houston, Mary Ellen Bute studied painting in Texas and, subsequently, Philadelphia at the Pennsylvania Academy of the Fine Arts, then stage lighting at Yale University. She studied the tradition of color organs, as a means of painting with light. She worked with Leon Theremin and Thomas Wilfred and was also influenced by the abstract animated films of Oskar Fischinger. Bute's film-making has two relatively distinct modes. She created a series of abstract films exploring the relationship of sound and image in cinema, and a second body of work focused on the relation of language and cinema through adaptation of literary sources. Bute began her filmmaking career collaborating with Joseph Schillinger on the animation of visual representations of music. Her later films were made in partnership with her cinematographer Ted Nemeth whom she married in 1940.

In the 1960s and 1970s Bute worked on two films which were never completed: an adaptation of Thornton Wilder's 1942 play The Skin of Our Teeth, and a film about Walt Whitman with the working title Out of the Cradle Endlessly Rocking. Her final film, inspired by James Joyce, was Passages from Finnegans Wake, a live-action feature produced and directed by Bute, made over a nearly three-year period in 1965-67, and recipient of a Cannes Film Festival award. 

Bute was a founding member of the Women's Independent Film Exchange. She chose film historian Cecile Starr to distribute her short films.

Mary Ellen Bute died of heart failure at New York City's Cabrini Medical Center. She was five weeks short of her 77th birthday. Six months earlier, on April 4, she received a special tribute and a retrospective of her films at the Museum of Modern Art.

Filmography 

Synchromy – 1933, collaboration with Joseph Schillinger and Lewis Jacobs [unfinished].
Rhythm in Light – 1934 (b&w, 5 min.) in collaboration with Melville Webber and Ted Nemeth.
Synchromy No. 2 – 1935 (b&w, 5.5 min.) music: Evening Star from Tannhäuser by Richard Wagner.
Dada – 1936 (b&w, 3min.) short for Universal Newsreel.
Parabola – 1937 (b&w, 9 min.) music: Création du monde by Darius Milhaud.
Synchromy No.4 - Escape – 1937 (color, 4.5 min.) music: Toccata in D Minor by J.S. Bach.
Spook Sport – 1939 (color, 8 min.) music: Danse macabre by Camille Saint-Saëns. Animation by Norman McLaren.
 Tarantella – 1940 (color, 5 min.) 
 Polka Graph – 1947 (color, 4.5 min.) music: Dmitri Shostakovich's Polka from The Age of Gold.
 Color Rhapsodie – 1948 (color, 6 min.)
 Pastorale – 1950 (color, 9 min.) music: Bach's Sheep May Safely Graze.
 Abstronic – 1952 (color, 7 min.) music: Aaron Copland's Hoe Down and Don Gillis's Ranch House Party.
 Mood Contrasts – 1953 (color, 7 min.)
 Imagination – 1957 (color) compilation background for musical sequence, Steve Allen Show (November 17, 1957)
 The Boy Who Saw Through – 1958 (b&w, 25 min.) (producer) stars a young Christopher Walken [not abstract].
 New Sensations in Sound – @1959 (color, 3 min.) advertising film for RCA.
 Passages from James Joyce's Finnegans Wake – 1965–67 (b&w, 97 min.) (director and co-writer) screened at the Cannes Film Festival [not abstract].

References

External links
Mary Ellen Bute Papers. General Collection, Beinecke Rare Book and Manuscript Library, Yale University. 
Cecile Starr Papers Relating to Mary Ellen Bute. General Collection, Beinecke Rare Book and Manuscript Library, Yale University.
  

1906 births
1983 deaths
20th-century American women artists
American experimental filmmakers
American women film directors
American women film producers
American animated film directors
American animated film producers
Cinema pioneers
Visual music artists
American women animators
Women experimental filmmakers
Animators from New York (state)
People from Houston